Western Bay of Plenty District Council is the territorial authority for the Western Bay of Plenty District of New Zealand.

The council is led by the mayor of Western Bay of Plenty, who is currently . There are also 11 ward councillors.

References

External links

 Official website

Western Bay of Plenty District
Politics of the Bay of Plenty Region
Territorial authorities of New Zealand